Jamaica participated in the 2010 Summer Youth Olympics in Singapore.

The Jamaican team included 15 athletes competing in 3 sports: athletics, badminton and swimming.

Medalists

Athletics

Boys
Track and Road Events

Field Events

Girls
Track and Road Events

Field Events

Badminton

Boys

Swimming

References

External links
Competitors List: Jamaica

Nations at the 2010 Summer Youth Olympics
2010 in Jamaican sport
Jamaica at the Youth Olympics